Old Greenwood High School is a historic high school building located at Greenwood, Greenwood County, South Carolina.  It was  designed by the firm of Wilson, Berryman & Kennedy and built in 1925–1926.  It is a complex of three brick buildings – the main building, the auditorium, and the gymnasium – each of which is in the Georgian Revival style and form a Palladian configuration. Each of the three buildings features a portico supported by six Tuscan order columns. The complex was completed with construction of the gymnasium building in 1929–1930.

It was listed on the National Register of Historic Places in 1985.

References

School buildings on the National Register of Historic Places in South Carolina
Georgian Revival architecture in South Carolina
Palladian Revival architecture in the United States
School buildings completed in 1930
National Register of Historic Places in Greenwood County, South Carolina
Buildings and structures in Greenwood, South Carolina
1985 establishments in South Carolina
1930 establishments in South Carolina